Omiodes rufescens is a moth in the family Crambidae. It was described by George Hampson in 1912. It is found in the Bahamas and the United States, where it has been recorded from Florida.

The wingspan is about 25 mm. Adults are on wing nearly year round in Florida.

References

Moths described in 1912
rufescens